Brandi is both a surname and a given name. For more on the name see Brandy.

Surname:
 Albrecht Brandi (1914–1966), German U-boat commander in World War II
 Cesare Brandi (1906–1988), Italian art historian
 Ernst Brandi (1875–1937), German mining-engineer and industrial-manager
 Karl Brandi (1868–1946), German historian
 Nunzio Brandi (born 2001), Italian footballer
 Piero Brandi (1939–2004), Italian boxer
 Tom Brandi (born 1966), American professional wrestler

Given name:
 Brandi Carlile (born 1981), American singer and songwriter
 Brandi Chastain (born 1968), American soccer player
 Brandi Cossairt (born 1984), American chemist
 Brandi Glanville (born 1972), American model and television personality
 Brandi Shearer (born 1980), Amiter
 Brandi Rhodes (born 1983), American professional wrestler

See also
 Brandie
 Brandy